Bijpur is a census town part of Dudhi Tehsil in Sonbhadra district  in the state of Uttar Pradesh, India.It is the border town located at UP - Madhya border.

Demographics
As of the 2001 Census of India, Bijpur had a population of 9232. Males constitute 53% of the population and females 47%. Bijpur has an average literacy rate of 72%, higher than the national average of 59.5%; with male literacy of 79% and female literacy of 65%. 16% of the population is under 6 years of age. Here NTPC, the largest power generation utility in India, has set up a 3000MW thermal power generation utility. The name of NTPC residential colony is Rihand Nagar. Also here is the famous Govind Vallabhpant Sagar, the backwaters of Rihand Dam in Uttar Pradesh.

Gram Panchayat Election Bijpur 2021

Gram panchayat Bijpur Election Result 2021

           Gram Pardhan 
 Dasmati w/o Vishram Sagar Gupta (by 1290 vote) 

       Gram Panchayat Members

1- Geeta Pansad w/o Sagar (by 122 vote) 

2- Sohan lal s/o Shiv parshad (by 133 vote) 

3- Urmila w/o Vijay (by 214 vote) 

4- Savita Devi w/o Ravindra Parshad (by 247 vote) 

5- Daili w/o Ramgopal (by 136 vote)
 
6- Ravinda Parshad s/o Indradev Saha (by 60 vote) 

7- Ompati w/o Ramdhan (by 27 vote) 

8- Shakti Shubham Mishra s/o Sashi Bhusan (by 41 vote) 

9- Anand Kumar s/o Jasvir Singh (by39 vote) 

10- Abha Singh w/o Indradev Singh (by 9 vote) 

11- Salma Khatoon w/o Md Meer Hasan (Without opposition) 

12- Narendra s/o Ramprasad (by 11 vote) 

13- Md Meer Hasan s/o Sakur Miya(Without opposition) 

14- Indra Dev s/o Vishwanath (by 24 vote) 

15- Parvati Devi w/o Rajkumar (by 21 vote) 

  Block Development Council (B.D.C) 

1- Mevalal s/o Fulsaha (by 328 vote)
 
2- Ashfak Qureshi s/o Nizam Qureshi (by 160 vote) 

3- Pammi Singh w/o Upendra Partap Singh (by 93 vote) 

4- Kaushal s/o Bhagwan (Without opposition) 

5- Vinod Kumar Rajak s/o Gopal Baitha (by 52 vote)

Educational institutes
There are three CBSE based Senior Secondary schools. They are:

2) Dayanand Anglo Vedic. Sr. Sec. Public School(D. A. V. Public School, Rihand Nagar)

3) Kendriya Vidyalaya, Rihand nagar

4) St. Joseph's School

Temples

1) Shiv Mandir (Rihand Nagar)2) Hanuman Mandir (Bijpur)3) Dudhiya Devi Mandir (Bijpur)

Mosque

1) Jama Masjid (Shanti Nagar)

References

Cities and towns in Sonbhadra district